The Strausberger Platz is a large urban square in the Berlin district of Friedrichshain-Kreuzberg and marks the border to the district of Mitte. It is connected via Karl-Marx-Allee with Alexanderplatz and via Lichtenberger Straße with the Platz der Vereinten Nationen. These two streets intersect in an oval roundabout at Strausberger Platz.

History
The square was the starting point for the East German uprising of 1953, when DDR wanted to increase the 'working norm' making workers work longer for the same pay.

Gallery

References

External links
 

Friedrichshain-Kreuzberg
Squares in Berlin